We Shall Be All: A History of the Industrial Workers of the World is a 1969 history book about the Industrial Workers of the World by Melvyn Dubofsky.

Bibliography

External links 

 
 Available for borrowing at the Internet Archive

1969 non-fiction books
English-language books
Books about labor history
History of the Industrial Workers of the World